Maude Banks (1857–1927) was an American stage actress.

Life 
Maud Banks, the daughter of Nathaniel Prentiss Banks, was born in 1857. After a course of study and training at the New York school of acting, she went upon the stage in 1886, making her first appearance at Portsmouth, New Hampshire, in the character of Parthenia in Ingomar. She may also have written plays.

She died, unmarried, in 1927.

References

Sources 

 Wilson, J. G.; Fiske, J., eds. (1888). "Banks, Nathaniel Prentiss". Appletons' Cyclopædia of American Biography. Vol. 1. New York: D. Appleton & Co. p. 159. 
 "Actresses in Real Tears; Final Rehearsal of "The City's Heart" Too Strenuous. It Resulted in the Postponement for One Week of the Professional Woman's League's Matinee". The New York Times. April 18, 1902. . Retrieved January 25, 2023.
 "Services Miss Maude Banks". Lewiston Evening Journal. December 21, 1927. p. 2.

Further reading 

 "A Group of Famous Daughters". The Century Illustrated Monthly Magazine, 43(2). December, 1891.
 "Personal". The Philadelphia Times. October 17, 1886. p. 4.

External links 

 Shields, David S. "Maude Banks". Broadway Photographs. Retrieved August 19, 2022.
 "Maude Banks (1857–1927)". Find a Grave. Retrieved February 25, 2023.

1857 births
1927 deaths
19th-century American actresses
American stage actresses